Kuchchal or Kuchchhal or Kuchhal is an Indian clan of the Rajvanshi and Agrawal community. Agrasen established 18 Gotras (or clans) for each of his 18 Ganadhipati based on the names of their Guru and divided his empire among them.

Details

Kuchchal is one of the original 18 Gotras established by Agrasen. Agrasen was a Hindu Kshatriya king of Suryavansha (Sun) dynasty in North India. His capital was Agroha, near Modern Hisar, Haryana. Agroha means land of Agrawals/Aggras.

Surname 
Kuchchal is used as surname or last name by some Agrawal.

 Gotra/Surname : Kuchchal
 Rishi : Kashyap
 Lord : Karanchand
 Saint (Guru) : Kush or Kashyap
 Veda : Samaveda
 Branch : Kosami or Kauttham
 Sutra : Kaatyayni

See also 
Agrahari
Agarwal
Agrasen
Agarwal
Kesharwani

References

External links
Maharaja Agrasen at agrasen.com
Detailed information at maharajaagrasen.com

Gotras of Agarwal
Agrawal
Indian surnames
Social groups of India